JS Jintsū (DE-230) is the second ship of the s. She was commissioned on 28 February 1990.

Construction and career
Jintsū was laid down at Hitachi Zosen Corporation Maizuru Shipyard on 14 April 1988 and launched on 31 January 1989. She was commissioned on 28 February 1990 and deployed to Maizuru.

On 7 December 1992, the Russian Navy   was monitored at the Tsushima Strait East Waterworks.

The vessel joined the Maizuru District Force 24th Escort Corps on 6 November 2003. On 17 June 2005, she was transferred to the 25th Escort Corps of the Ominato District Force, and the homeport was transferred from Maizuru to Ominato. On 26 March 2008, the 25th escort was renamed to the 15th escort due to a major reorganization of the Self-Defense Fleet, and was reorganized under the escort fleet.

From 23–27 July 2010, after attending the 130th anniversary event and observing ceremony off the coast of Vladivostok, Russia, Jintsū participated in the 11th Russo-Japanese Search and Rescue Joint Training SAREX with the escort ship .

On 1 June 2011, the escort fleet was transferred to the 13th escort corps due to reorganization, and the homeport was transferred from Ominato to Sasebo.

Gallery

Citations

External links

1989 ships
Abukuma-class destroyer escorts
Ships built by Hitachi Zosen Corporation